John J. Loughlin II (born March 3, 1959) is an American politician who is a Republican member of the Rhode Island House of Representatives, representing the 71st District from 2005 to 2010. During the 2009-2010 sessions he served on the House Committees on Labor and Veterans Affairs, and he also served as minority whip. In June, 2010 he announced that he would not run for another term and that he would be running for U.S. Congress in the First Congressional seat being vacated by Patrick J. Kennedy.  He lost in the 2010 General elections to outgoing Providence Mayor David Cicilline.

Loughlin currently hosts The John Loughlin Show on local Providence radio station WPRO (AM) Saturdays from 11am-2pm.

References

External links
Rhode Island House - Representative John Loughlin, Jr. official RI House website

Republican Party members of the Rhode Island House of Representatives
1959 births
Living people
People from Tiverton, Rhode Island